Tillicoultry railway station served the town of Tillicoultry, Clackmannanshire, Scotland from 1851 to 1964 on the Devon Valley Railway and the Stirling and Dunfermline Railway.

History 
The station opened on 22 December 1851 by the Devon Valley Railway. To the south west were coal pits, being served by Alloa Waggonway. To the south was the signal box. To the north was a goods station, which had a turntable, a loading bank and a shed. The station was originally a terminus until the stations to the east opened. Another platform was added in 1904 as well as a new signal box to the north, replacing the original one. The station closed to both passengers and goods traffic on 15 June 1964. The signal box closed in 1967.

References

External links 

Disused railway stations in Clackmannanshire
Railway stations in Great Britain opened in 1851
Railway stations in Great Britain closed in 1964
Beeching closures in Scotland
Former North British Railway stations
1851 establishments in Scotland
1964 disestablishments in Scotland